Lawrence is a masculine given name. It is an Anglicisation of the French Laurent, which is in turn derived from the Latin Laurentius or Old Greek Lavrenti. Pet forms of Lawrence include Larry and Lawrie.

People

Christianity
 Lawrence of Rome (died 258), deacon and Roman Catholic saint, born in Spain
 Lawrence I (bishop of Milan), bishop of Milan from 490 to c. 511, Roman Catholic saint
 Lawrence, Archbishop of Split (died 1099), Benedictine monk and Archbishop of Split 1060–1099
 Brother Lawrence de la Résurrection (died 1691), Carmelite monk

Arts and entertainment
 Lawrence Brownlee (born 1972), American opera singer
 Lawrence Gray (1898–1970), American actor
 Lawrence (musician), English singer, songwriter and guitarist Lawrence Hayward (born 1961)
 Lawrence Ng, Hong Kong actor
 Lawrence Raghavendra, South Indian film actor
 Lawrence Saint (1885–1961), American stained glass artist
 Lawrence Weingarten (1897–1975), American film producer 
 Lawrence Welk (1903–1992), American band leader, accordion player, and television host

Business
 Lawrence Bossidy, former chairman of Honeywell, former CEO and chairman of AlliedSignal, current chairman of Merck & Co.
 Lawrence Hunt, internet entrepreneur and CEO of Silverjet
 Lawrence E. Page (born 1973), co-founder of Google Inc.
 Lawrence Stroll (born 1959), Canadian businessman, part-owner of Racing Point F1 Team
 Lawrence Wackett (1896–1982), airplane designer, entrepreneur and manager, the father of the Australian aircraft industry

Education
 Lawrence S. Bacow, former president of Tufts University
 Lawrence M. Krauss, professor of physics and President of The Origins Project Foundation
 Lawrence Lessig, professor of physics at Cornell University
 Lawrence Solan (born 1952), American professor of law at Brooklyn Law School
Lawrence A. Tabak, American dentist and biomedical scientist

Politics
 Lawrence (judge royal) (died after 1180), Hungarian nobleman, Judge royal 1164–1172
 Lavrentiy Beria, Soviet politician
 Lawrence A. Conner, Sr., American politician
 Lawrence T. Fuglaar (1895-1972), American politician
 Christopher Lawrence "Bong" Go (born 1974), Filipino politician
 Lawrence Gonzi, Maltese politician and former Prime Minister (2004-2013)
 Lawrence M. Rulison (1917–1966), American lawyer and politician

Sports
 Lawrence Akandu (born 1974), Nigerian-born Hong Kong football player
 Lawrence Cager (born 1997), American football player
 Lawrence Chimezie Akandu (born 1974), Nigerian-born Hong Kong football player
 Lawrence Dallaglio (born 1972), English former rugby union player
 Lawrence Hardy (born 1913), English footballer
 Lawrence Jacquelin (1923–1992), American NASCAR driver
 Lawrence Naesen (born 1992), Belgian cyclist
 Lawrence Ng (fencer) (born 1999), Hong Kong fencer
 Lawrence Okoye (born 1991), British-born American football player and Olympian
 Lawrence Peckham (born 1944), Australian high jumper
 Lawrence Sampleton (born 1959), American former football player
 Lawrence Taylor (born 1959), Hall-of-Fame American retired football player
 Lawrence Thomas (footballer) (born 1992), Australian footballer
 Lawrence Virgil (born 1990), American football player

Other
 Lawrence Baskir (born 1938), American federal judge 
 Lawrence Hargrave (1850-1915), Australian inventor, explorer, astronomer, engineer and aeronautical pioneer
 Lawrence Joel (1928–1984), United States Army medic awarded the Medal of Honor
 Lawrence Oates (1880–1912), member of the ill-fated Scott expedition to the South Pole
 Lawrence Singleton (1927–2001), American criminal
 Lawrence Nassar also known as Larry Nassar, a US Lebanese criminal and former medical professional

Fictional characters
 Lawrence Alamain, character from the American soap opera Days of Our Lives
 Lawrence Fletcher, Ferb's dad and Phineas's stepdad in the Disney animated series Phineas and Ferb
 Lawrence, minor character from Mona the Vampire
 Lawrence, character from School of Rock
 Lawrence, character from Insecure 
 Dr. Lawrence Gordon, character from the Saw franchise

See also 
 
 Larry (disambiguation)
 Laurence
 Lawrence (surname)
 Lawrence (disambiguation)
 Lawrie, including a list of people with the given name, many of them named Lawrence

References

English masculine given names
English given names
Given names derived from plants or flowers